João Derly de Oliveira Nunes Jr. (born June 2, 1981 in Porto Alegre, Rio Grande do Sul) is a former male judo player from Brazil, the only Brazilian to ever become a two-time world champion (along with Mayra Aguiar), winning consecutively the 2005 World Judo Championships and 2007 World Judo Championships. He also won the junior world championship in 2000, the 2007 Pan American Games, and has 5 gold, 2 silver and 1 bronze medals in Judo World Cups.

After the 2002 South American Games he tested positive for banner diuretic drugs he used in order to maintain his weight class.

After retirement as a judoka, he was elected as city council member and later as a member of the House of Representatives. Later he was nominated secretary of sports of the State of Rio Grande do Sul.

References

External links
 

|-

1981 births
Living people
Olympic judoka of Brazil
Judoka at the 2008 Summer Olympics
Judoka at the 2007 Pan American Games
World judo champions
Brazilian male judoka
Sportspeople from Porto Alegre
Pan American Games gold medalists for Brazil
Pan American Games medalists in judo
Brazilian sportspeople in doping cases
Republicans (Brazil) politicians
Sustainability Network politicians
Communist Party of Brazil politicians
Universiade medalists in judo
Universiade bronze medalists for Brazil
Medalists at the 2007 Pan American Games
Competitors at the 2002 South American Games